Rock the American Way is the first album by heavy metal band Jack Starr's Burning Starr. Released in 1985 by Passport Records.

Track listing

Personnel
Frank Vestry – Vocals
Jack Starr – Guitar
Bruno Ravel – Bass
Greg D'Angelo – Drums

References 

1985 albums
Passport Records albums